Miers Valley is a valley in the McMurdo Dry Valleys located just south of Marshall Valley and west of Koettlitz Glacier, on the coast of Victoria Land, Antarctica. The valley is ice-free in the Austral summer except for Miers Glacier and Adams Glacier in its upper (western) part, and Lake Miers near its center. Penance Pass connects it to the valley of Shangri-la.

It was mapped and named by Robert Falcon Scott's British Antarctic Expedition, 1910–13, possibly after Edward J. Miers, a marine biologist from the British Museum (Natural History) who examined crustacea from the Erebus and Terror expeditions. A hut stood in the valley from 1984–94.

Miers Stream is named in association with Miers Valley. A small elevated valley called The Altiplano sits roughly between Findlay Ridge and Miers Valley.

References

Valleys of Victoria Land
McMurdo Dry Valleys